Estvan Svend Aage Wehlast (15 April 1916 – 9 February 1945) was a member of the Danish resistance killed by Gestapo while resisting arrest.

Biography 

Estvan Svend Aage Wehlast was born in Læssøgade 10-I, Copenhagen 15 April 1916 as the first of five children to machine worker Holger Wehlast and wife Karen Sofie Frederikke née Andersen and baptized in St. John's Church, Copenhagen the second Sunday after Trinity.

In 1921 the family lived on the same address, with the father supporting them as a stoker at Carlsberg Brewery.

On 1 November 1922 the family moved to Smørumvej 60, Husum.

In 1930 the family still lived there with Wehlast working as an apprentice mechanic at Godthaabsvej on Frederiksberg.

On 9 February 1945 Gestapo attempted to arrest Wehlast and his six years younger brother Egon Frants Albert Wehlast at Smørumvej 60 where they kept a duplicating machine. Wehlast resisted the arrest and was shot and killed, while his brother was interned in Frøslev Prison Camp.

After his death 

On 30 June 1945 at Vestre Kirkegaard a memorial service was held for him, as well as for executed member of the resistance Harald Christensen.

On 29 August Wehlast and 105 other victims of the occupation were given a state funeral in the memorial park founded at the execution and burial site in Ryvangen where their remains had been exhumed. Bishop Hans Fuglsang-Damgaard led the service with participation from the royal family, the government and representatives of the resistance movement.

Soon after the funeral the authorities received information that not only had Wehlast contributed very little to the resistance, but also that he and his brother had committed a series of crimes including robbery, and there were demands to remove his remains from the memorial park. Thus on 3 May 1946, one day prior to the first anniversary of the liberation, Wehlast was exhumed a second time, after his father had agreed to pay for his funeral at the local Brønshøj cemetery. Remarkably, a second resistance member to also be removed from the memorial park was the above-mentioned Harald Christensen.

The official list of resistance members buried in Ryvangen does not include Wehlast, nor Christensen.

References 

1916 births
1945 deaths
Danish people of World War II
Danish resistance members
Resistance members killed by Nazi Germany